Cuthbert Morton Girdlestone (17 September 1895 – 10 December 1975) was a British musicologist and literary scholar.

Born in Bovey Tracey, Devon, he was educated at Cambridge and the Sorbonne, and thereafter took up the chair in French in Armstrong College, later to be King's College in Newcastle in 1926, a position he held until 1960.  His most famous publications are his much-reprinted study of the Mozart Piano Concertos (1939, published originally in French) and his biography of Jean-Philippe Rameau (1957).

Books
Girdlestone, Cuthbert. Mozart et ses concertos pour piano. Paris, Fischbacher. 1939.
Girdlestone, Cuthbert. Mozart and His Piano Concertos. New York: Dover Publications, 1964. "An unabridged and corrected republication of the second (1958) edition of the work first published in 1948 by Cassell & Company, Ltd., London, under the title Mozart’s Piano Concertos." A translation of Mozart et ses concertos pour piano.  (pbk.) (3rd edition published London: Cassell, 1978. .)
Girdlestone, Cuthbert. Jean-Philippe Rameau, His Life and Work. London: Cassell. 1957. (2nd Edition: Paris: Lettres modernes, 1968, and in English: New York: Dover Publications, 1969. .)
Girdlestone, Cuthbert. Jean-Philippe Rameau: sa vie, son œuvre. Desclée de Brouwer, 1983, ©1962. .
Girdlestone, Cuthbert. La tragédie en musique, considéré comme genre littéraire. Droz, Geneva. 1972. OCoLC 772775.

Notes

References
Obituary notice (1976). The Musical Times, 117, 249.

1895 births
1975 deaths
Alumni of Trinity College, Cambridge
College of Sorbonne alumni
English writers about music
Mozart scholars
Chevaliers of the Légion d'honneur
20th-century Austrian composers
20th-century Austrian male musicians
20th-century British musicologists